Kazakhstan competed at the 2011 World Championships in Athletics from August 27 to September 4 in Daegu, South Korea.

Team selection

A team of 14 athletes was
announced to represent the country
in the event.  The team will be led by former olympic medalist Dmitriy Karpov and triple jumper Olga Rypakova.

The following athletes appeared on the preliminary Entry List, but not on the Official Start List of the specific event:

Medalists
The following competitor from Kazakhstan won a medal at the Championships

Results

Men

Decathlon

Women

References

External links
Official local organising committee website
Official IAAF competition website

Nations at the 2011 World Championships in Athletics
World Championships in Athletics
Kazakhstan at the World Championships in Athletics